Santa Rosa is a district of the Lima Province in Peru. Officially established as a district on February 6, 1962. The district's postal code is 38. It limits to the north and the east with the Ancón District, to the west with the Pacific Ocean, to the south with the Ventanilla District.

The Santa Rosa Beach is the main attraction of the city. It is the first bay north of Callao, surrounded by sand mountains. In the north, the coastal natural formations of caves are concentrated: El Pirata and La Solitaria. The firm part of the land is crossed by the Santa Rosa Malecón, which is a hundred meters from the banks and is adorned by tall palm trees.

History
The district of Santa Rosa was created on February 6, 1962, by Law No. 13982 signed by the President of the Republic, Manuel Prado Ugarteche.

Santa Rosa went through the main historical stages, the pre-Hispanic and the republican. The first of them with its main forms of subsistence was linked to the sea because it was dedicated to shellfishing and fishing as a main economic activity but maintaining close ties of worship and exchange with farmers in the nearby valley of the Chillón River. The second historical stage begins formally with the foundation of the district in 1962, on the basis of the "Urbanization Country Club" whose habilitation had begun in the middle of the previous decade.

The economic, social, cultural and political changes in Lima -as the capital of Peru- affected the reality of the district of Santa Rosa, now characterized by rapid growth, provincial profile, emerging and thriving.

In this way, the district of Santa Rosa is home to a diverse community that includes from citizens of Human Settlements and the owners of summer homes.

It has become the district most visited by tourists in Lima North. Famous for being the headquarters of more than 500 companies, generally dedicated to the field of transport, restaurants, advertising, internet, real estate and hotels.

Geography
The district has a total land area of 21.5 km2. Its administrative center is located 79 meters above sea level.

Boundaries
 North and East: Ancón
 South: Ventanilla (in the Callao Region)
 West: Pacific Ocean

Demographics
Santa Rosa is the sixth least populated district of Lima with 18,751 inhabitants, only surpassed by Pucusana (17,786), Punta Negra (8,271), San Bartolo (7,989), Punta Hermosa (7,895), and Santa María del Mar (1,675).

11% of the inhabitants are children under 5 years of age. 11.8% are from 6 to 11 years old, and 11.2% are from 12 to 17 years old.

There are 591 startups that are located in the district of Santa Rosa. The business density is 36 companies per 1000 inhabitants. With 42 restaurants in the district, 4 bakeries, 4 lodges, 11 official wineries, 1 hairdresser, 8 pharmacies, 1 tap, 56 buildings for family homes and 6 for multifamily.

Tourist places
In the district of Santa Rosa are located the most popular beaches of the capital along with the Ancón District.

- Balneario de Santa Rosa, located at kilometer 43 of the Panamericana Norte.

- Hondable Beach, located near the Ministry of Defense.

- Beach Visitor.

- Playa Grande, the only archaeological beach in Peru.
- El Pirata Cave, located in the north of the Balneario.

- Playa Chica.

- Punta Nerón.

- Santa Rosa Autodrome - Henry Bradley.

- Kartódromo Santa Rosa.

- Cerro Loma Larga.

- Cerro El Mirador.

- Club de la Union.

Festivities 
 February 6: Anniversary of the District
 August 30: Saint Rose of Lima

See also 
 Administrative divisions of Peru

References

External links 

 munisantarosa-lima.gob.pe

Districts of Lima
States and territories established in 1962
1962 establishments in Peru